Aung Cheint (also spelt Aung Cheimt, ; 1948 – August 9, 2021) was a Burmese poet. He is considered one of the greatest Burmese poets.

Early life 
Aung Cheint was born in 1948 in Tamwe Township, Yangon.

Career 
Aung Cheint is recognized as one of the modern poetry movement leaders, alongside Thukamein Hlaing, Maung Chaw Nwe and Phaw Way, in Myanmar. His famous works include Gandawin Ma Ma, Khin Khin Pyo Yay Saunt Khè Tae, and Athèzwè Gabyarsaya.

Death 
Aung Cheint died on August 9, 2021, at the age of 73, in Yangon.

References 

Burmese male poets
1948 births
2021 deaths
People from Yangon
20th-century Burmese poets
20th-century male writers
21st-century Burmese poets
21st-century male writers